Emilio Limón (born 4 December 1988) is a Surinamese international footballer who plays as a midfielder for Robinhood.

Career
Limón began his senior career in 2007 with Robinhood. Limón was one of eight players from Suriname to train with English team Sunderland in March 2008.

Limón made his international debut in June 2008, and made a total of 7 World Cup Qualifying appearances that year.

References

1988 births
Living people
Surinamese footballers
Suriname international footballers
S.V. Robinhood players
SVB Eerste Divisie players
Association football midfielders